Richard Gonda (born 14 March 1994, in Banská Bystrica) is a professional racing driver from Slovakia.

Career

Karting
Gonda began karting in 2003 and raced primarily in his native Slovakia for the majority of his career, working his way up from the junior ranks with the seven national titles.

CEZ Championship E2-2000  and Formula Renault
In 2010, Gonda graduated to single-seaters, racing in the Central European Zone Championship E2-2000 series. He finished sixth with 37 points. He also completed in three rounds of the Formula Renault 2.0 Northern European Cup FR-2000 Class with Sophidea team and in Eurocup Formula Renault 2.0 round at Silverstone Circuit with Krenek Motorsport.

Gonda expanded his Eurocup Formula Renault 2.0 campaign in 2011, staying with Krenek Motorsport. He finished all but one races, without scoring a point. He also contested in three rounds of the Formula Renault 2.0 NEC series. And continued in the NEC series in the next year.

FIA Formula Two Championship
In 2012, Gonda graduated into the FIA Formula Two Championship.

Racing record

Career summary

† As Gonda was a guest driver, he was ineligible for championship points.

Complete Auto GP results
(key) (Races in bold indicate pole position) (Races in italics indicate fastest lap)

Complete GP3 Series results
(key) (Races in bold indicate pole position) (Races in italics indicate fastest lap)

References

External links

1994 births
Living people
Sportspeople from Banská Bystrica
Slovak racing drivers
Formula Renault Eurocup drivers
Formula Renault 2.0 NEC drivers
FIA Formula Two Championship drivers
Euroformula Open Championship drivers
Auto GP drivers
International GT Open drivers
24H Series drivers
Virtuosi Racing drivers
Jenzer Motorsport drivers
Drivex drivers
R-ace GP drivers
ART Grand Prix drivers
Porsche Carrera Cup Germany drivers